Isabella Lyn Briede (born October 3, 1998) is an American soccer midfielder who plays for San Diego Wave FC of the National Women's Soccer League. She previously played for the Stanford Cardinal women's soccer team.

College career 

Briede played for the Stanford Cardinal from 2017 to 2021, playing primarily as a deep or attacking midfielder. In her Cardinal career, she won two NCAA championships and three Pac-12 championships.

Club career 

San Diego Wave FC drafted Briede with the 27th-overall pick in the 2022 NWSL Draft. She scored her first professional goal on April 17, 2022, against Portland Thorns FC during the 2022 NWSL Challenge Cup, and her first NWSL regular season goal on July 3, 2022, against Washington Spirit.

International career 

Briede participated in U15, U18, U19, and U20 camps with the United States women's national soccer team from 2013 to 2017.

Honors

Stanford Cardinal 

 NCAA National Champion (2017, 2019)
 Pac-12 Champion (2017, 2018, 2019)
 All-Pac-12 Third Team (2020–21)

References

External links 

 San Diego Wave FC profile
 NWSL profile
 Stanford profile
 
 
 

1998 births
Living people
People from Alpharetta, Georgia
American women's soccer players
Soccer players from Georgia (U.S. state)
Sportspeople from Fulton County, Georgia
Women's association football midfielders
Stanford Cardinal women's soccer players
National Women's Soccer League players
San Diego Wave FC players
San Diego Wave FC draft picks